Lorenzaccio is a 1951 Italian historical drama film directed by Raffaello Pacini and starring Giorgio Albertazzi, Folco Lulli and Anna Maria Ferrero. It is an adaptation of the 1834 play Lorenzaccio by Alfred de Musset about the life of Lorenzino de' Medici.

Cast
 Giorgio Albertazzi as Lorenzo de' Medici, nicknamed Lorenzaccio  
 Folco Lulli as Scoronconcalo  
 Anna Maria Ferrero as Luisa Strozzi  
 Franca Marzi as Clarice  
 Lia Di Leo as Courtesan  
 Arnoldo Foà as Alessandro de' Medici, Duke of Florence 
 Marcello Giorda 
 Carlo D'Angelo 
 Natale Cirino 
 Silvio Bagolini 
 Franco Balducci 
 Fedele Gentile 
 Alessandro Fersen 
 Dolores Palumbo 
 Mario Billi 
 Piero Pastore
 Mercedes Brignone 
 Vera Palumbo 
 Giorgio Specchi as Ser Maurizio

References

Bibliography 
 Alberto Farassino. Lux film. Il Castoro, 2000.

External links 
 

1950s historical drama films
Italian historical drama films
1951 films
1950s Italian-language films
Films directed by Raffaello Pacini
Films scored by Carlo Rustichelli
Films set in Florence
Films set in the 16th century
Italian films based on plays
Films based on works by Alfred de Musset
Cultural depictions of Lorenzo de' Medici
Lux Film films
1951 drama films
Italian black-and-white films
1950s Italian films